Yulia Zivert (born 28 November 1990), known professionally as Zivert, is a Russian singer. Her career started in 2017 after releasing her first singles "Чак" and "Анестезия". She gained international fame in 2018 with her single "Life".

Early life and career 
Yulia Zivert was born on 28 November 1990 in Moscow. She described music as her childhood dream since she used to make home concerts almost every day.

In 2017 Zivert signed with the Russian label First Music Publishing (FMP). Her debut single called "Чак", she presented in her YouTube channel on April 1, 2017. On 17 June she released the video clip of the song. Her second single "Анестезия", was released on 15 September, with video being released on 17 January 2018. On April 6, 2018 the singer released her first mini album, called «Сияй». A total of 4 tracks were listed: "Еще хочу", "Зеленые волны", "Сияй" and "Океан".

On March 12, 2019, a video for the song "Life", was presented on YouTube, it became the most searched single in Shazam for 2019, and also took the first line of the most popular tracks of 2019 according to Yandex Music and second place in the ranking of the most listened tracks in Russia according to Apple Music.  The video was filmed in Hong Kong. 

In September 2019 she released her debut album Vinyl #1, since then the singer has gone on to release multiple hit singles.

Albums

Singles

Music videos

Awards and nominations

References

External links
 
 

Living people
1990 births
21st-century Russian singers
21st-century Russian women singers
Russian pop singers
Singers from Moscow
Russian-language singers
Russian National Music Award winners